BrainChip (ASX:BRN, OTC:BRCHF) is an Australia-based technology company, founded in 2004 by Peter Van Der Made, that specializes in developing advanced artificial intelligence (AI) and machine learning (ML) hardware. The company's primary products are the MetaTF development environment, which allows the training and deployment of spiking neural networks (SNN), and the AKD1000 neuromorphic processor, a hardware implementation of their spiking neural network system. BrainChip's technology is based on a neuromorphic computing architecture, which attempts to mimic the way the human brain works. The company is a part of Intel Foundry Services and Arm AI partnership.

History 
Australian mining company Aziana acquired BrainChip in March 2015. Later, via a reverse merger of the now dormant Aziana in September 2015 BrainChip was put on the Australian Stock Exchange (ASX), and van der Made started commercializing his original idea for artificial intelligence processor hardware. In 2016, the company appointed former Exar CEO Louis Di Nardo as CEO; Van Der Made then took the position of CTO. In October 2021, the company announced that it was taking orders for its Akida AI Processor Development Kits, and in January 2022, that it was taking orders for its Akida AI Processor PCIe boards. In April 2022, BrainChip partnered with NVISO to provide collaboration with applications and technologies. In November 2022, BrainChip added the Rochester Institute of Technology to its University AI accelerator program. The next month, BrainChip was a part of Intel Foundry Services. In January 2023, Edge Impulse announced support for BrainChip's AKD processor.

MetaTF 

The MetaTF software is designed to work with a variety of image, video, and sensor data, and is intended to be implemented in a range of applications, including security, surveillance, autonomous vehicles, and industrial automation. The software uses Python to create spiking neural networks (or convert other neural networks to SNNs) for use on the AKD processor hardware. The software is also capable of SNN deployment on normal processors.

The AKD processor 
The Akida 1000 processor is an event-based neural processing device with 1.2 million artificial neurons and 10 billion artificial synapses. Utilizing event-based possessing, it analyzes essential inputs at specific points. Results are stored in the on-chip memory units.  

The processor contains 80 nodes that communicate over a mesh network. Each node consists of four either convolutional or fully connected Neural Processing Units (NPUs), coupled with individual memory units. Akida runs an entire neural network executing all neuron layers in parallel. The design elements are meant to allow inference and incremental learning on edge devices with lower power consumption.

On January 29, 2023, BrainChip announced that it has completed the design of its AKD1500 reference chip on the GlobalFoundries’ 22nm fully depleted silicon-on-insulator (FD-SOI) technology.
On March 6, 2023, BrainChip announced the second generation of its Akida™ platform. BrainChip added support for 8-bit weights and activations, Vision Transformer (ViT) engine, and hardware support for a Temporal Event-Based Neural Net (TENN). 
On March 12, 2023, BrainChip announced that the Akida™ processor family integrates with the Arm® Cortex®-M85 processor.  The global and market response to these announcements was substantial, making headlines among stock-watching news sources.

AKD Products 
 Akida PCIe Board
 Akida Development Kit Shuttle PC
 Akida Development Kit Raspberry Pi

See also 
 Cognitive computer
 Spiking neural network
 S&P/ASX 200
 Neuromorphic engineering

References

External links 
Brainchip-empowers-next-generation-technology
edge-impulse-and-brainchip-partner-to-further-ai-development-with-support-for-the-akida-platform
Brainchip-joins-technology-partners-during
MegaChips Forms Strategic Partnership with BrainChip
BrainChip Adds Rochester Institute of Technology to Its University AI Accelerator Program
BrainChip Introduces a Powerful Neural Network Converter
markets for Brainchip
"BrainChip’s founder takes chips off the table"
"BrainChip Readies 2nd Gen Platform For Power-Efficient Edge AI"
"Brainchip Extends AI, Machine Learning In Space And Time With Bio-Inspired Neural Networks"

Computer hardware companies
Application-specific integrated circuits
AI accelerators
Artificial neural networks
Machine learning
Hardware acceleration
Australian companies established in 2004
Companies based in Sydney
Companies listed on the Australian Securities Exchange